The 30th Biathlon World Championships were held in 1995 for the third time in Antholz-Anterselva, Italy.

Men's results

20 km individual

10 km sprint

Team event

4 × 7.5 km relay

Women's results

15 km individual

7.5 km sprint

Team event

4 × 7.5 km relay

Medal table

References

1995
Biathlon World Championships
International sports competitions hosted by Italy
1995 in Italian sport
February 1995 sports events in Europe
Biathlon competitions in Italy
Sport in South Tyrol